William de Lodelawe was an English medieval university chancellor.

Between 1255 and 1256, William de Lodelawe was Chancellor of Oxford University.

References

Year of birth unknown
Year of death unknown
English Roman Catholics
Chancellors of the University of Oxford
13th-century English people
13th-century Roman Catholics